Ardozyga crypsibatis is a species of moth in the family Gelechiidae. It was described by Edward Meyrick in 1904. It is found in Australia, where it has been recorded from Tasmania, New South Wales and South Australia.

The forewings are light fuscous irrorated (speckled) with whitish scales pointed with dark fuscous. The stigmata are round, dark fuscous, the plical rather obliquely beyond the first discal, another similar dot below the second discal. There is a dark fuscous marginal line above the apex. The hindwings are pale grey.

References

Ardozyga
Moths described in 1904
Taxa named by Edward Meyrick
Moths of Australia